The Jeju Stadium is a multi-purpose stadium in Jeju City, Jeju-do, South Korea. It is currently used mostly for football matches. The stadium was used by K League team Jeju United between 2007 and 2010. The stadium has a capacity of 20,053 people and was opened in 1968. The stadium was used for 2017 AFC Champions League round of 16 1st leg match against Urawa Red Diamonds since their regular stadium was used for 2017 FIFA U-20 World Cup.

References

External links
 Official website 
 Stadium image

Sports venues in South Korea
Football venues in South Korea
Sports venues completed in 1968
Multi-purpose stadiums in South Korea
Sport in Jeju Province
Jeju United FC
Buildings and structures in Jeju Province